Smokeless fuel is a type of solid fuel which either does not emit visible smoke or emits minimal amounts during combustion. These types of fuel are popular in areas which ban the use of coal and other fuels such as unseasoned or wet wood which produce smoke.

As a result of many places banning smoke and pollution, some studies have shown that overall air quality has improved along with fewer annual deaths related to smoke. Smokeless fuels serve as a potential replacement for fuels such as coal, which produce smoke upon combustion. Examples of smokeless fuels are anthracite, coke, charcoal and hexamine fuel tablets. Smoke-free carbonaceous fuels are usually supplied in the form of standard pillow-shaped briquettes. Such fuel tablets are used by campers for cooking or heating.

History 

Coal was widely used for domestic cooking and heating during the Victorian period and up to the early 1950s in most towns in Britain. However, low-quality coal fuels and badly designed fireplaces created a good deal of local pollution from smoke and tars produced from partial combustion of the coal and disappeared up the chimney. As a result, the smoke and noxious gases were often trapped locally when a weather inversion occurred. Such trapped gases and smoke caused fogs and worse, smogs which discoloured clothing and was a serious health hazard. Such pea soupers were generally more prevalent in the larger towns such as Manchester, Birmingham and London. There were also toxic gases such as sulphur dioxide and nitrogen oxides present in the same noxious mixture, both of which irritated the lungs of those exposed to the smog. The former gas produced by sulphur impurities in the coal, was especially iniquitous since it oxidises further in the air to produce sulphuric acid, a highly corrosive and strong acid.

London 

In 1952, the Great Smog of London directly killed a great number of people, with estimates varying between 4,000 and 12,000 casualties, by exacerbating existing lung diseases such as bronchitis and breathing disorders like asthma. It also killed indirectly by causing many rail, road, and pedestrian accidents created by the impenetrable gloom of the smog. Clothes were stained by the soot and generally discoloured by the sulphurous gases.  Because of this tragedy the Clean Air Act 1956 was passed to attempt to solve this problem. One of the results of this act was the development of smokeless fuels, which were designed specifically to aid the environment by reducing the amount of smoke produced, as well as removing some impurities such as sulphur in the coal. Such manufactured fuels also burnt at a higher temperature and so made for a better and more efficient fuel for open fires as well as stoves.

Benefits 
Smokeless coal is more efficient than a conventional open coal fire indoors because the high working temperature is radiated into the room as infra-red radiation, as can be judged by the bright red coloration of a mature fire. The hot gases produced are lost up the chimney, thereby reducing efficiency just as in an open coal fire. The gases mainly consist of carbon dioxide, carbon monoxide, and some water vapor. With little or no smoke or similar volatile compounds, chimneys remain cleaner longer and require brushing less frequently. The main combustion reaction is:

C (s) + O2 (g) → CO2 (g)

In a restricted supply of air or oxygen, then toxic carbon monoxide can be formed:

2 C (s) + O2 (g) → 2 CO (g)

Charcoal, either in unprocessed sticks or as shaped briquettes, is widely used for outdoor barbecue grills owing to its relatively low production of smoke and the intense heat generated which cooks food relatively quickly. What little smoke is produced by the charcoal may impart a smoky flavor to grilled food. Charcoal, tea, and raw wood are also commonly used in the manufacture of various smoked products such as smoked salmon. Charcoal is widely used in African countries for domestic cooking purposes.

Calorific value

Smokeless fuels generally have a high calorific value, with that of anthracite being greater than dry wood for example, and many smokeless briquettes are made from this type of coal. Thus anthracite has a calorific value of 32.5 MJ/kg compared with that of dry wood of about 21 MJ/kg. Lignite or brown coal is even worse with a heat of combustion of only 15 MJ/kg, owing to the presence of non-combustible impurities. Bituminous coal has a value lower than anthracite, but neither lignite nor bituminous coal are smokeless owing to their volatiles content.

Downsides 
Smokeless fuels also have some downsides, typically they can be harder to ignite owing to the lack of volatiles present in anthracite for example. There are fewer flames, due to reduced volatiles but a generally higher ash content. Fines and dust can be produced by abrasion from mechanical movement but the amount is minimal compared with that produced by bituminous coal. It is sometimes supplied wet, even in sealed plastic bags, but is easily dried since the moisture is superficial. There is an increased cost to the user or consumer owing to the costs of mass manufacture although the loss of volatile chemicals such as coal tar can offset those costs to the manufacturer. Those extra costs make the fuel more expensive than coal, but the effect is small at about a 30% premium over coal at 2020 prices.

Since solid fuels are bulky and heavy, they need manual transport to the fireplace and storage in a convenient spot near to the house such as a coal bunker.

See also
 Briquette
 Clean Air Act Amendments of 1990
 Clean Air Act 1956
 Coke (fuel), a smokeless fuel made by carbonizing coal
 Energy density

References 

Fuels